Akhlakul Hossain Ahmed (15 October 1926 – 28 August 2012) was a Bangladeshi physician and politician from Netrokona belonging to Bangladesh Awami League. He was elected as a member of the East Pakistan Provincial Assembly in 1970. After the Liberation of Bangladesh he was appointed as a member of the Constituent Assembly of Bangladesh. He was an organizer of the Liberation War of Bangladesh.

Biography
Ahmed was born on 15 October 1926 at Chhayashi in Mohanganj of Netrokona. He was elected as a member of the East Pakistan Provincial Assembly Mohanganj-Barhatta constituency in 1970. During the Liberation War of Bangladesh he was the in-charge of Maheshkhola Youth Camp in Tura of Meghalaya in India. He was appointed as a member of the Constituent Assembly of Bangladesh after the Liberation of Bangladesh.

Ahmed died on 28 August 2012 at Holy Cross Hospital in Dhaka at the age of 85.

References

1926 births
2012 deaths
People from Netrokona District
Awami League politicians
Bengali independence activists
20th-century Bangladeshi physicians